Farabeuf's triangle is the triangular space in the upper portion of the neck where the bifurcation of the carotid artery can be seen. It is limited: the rear: the jugular vein; internal below and beyond: the facial vein; above and beyond: the hypoglossal nerve. This triangle serves as a reference to locate surgery elements that are in the carotid triangle.

The triangle of Farabeuf is bounded by the internal jugular vein (posterior), common facial vein (anterior-inferior) and hypoglossal nerve (anterior-superior). The jugulodigastric lymph node is commonly found within these boundaries, and drains the pharyngeal tonsil. The triangle had surgical significance in the late 19th century but now serves only for historical interest.

References

Human head and neck
Anatomy named for one who described it